The Khanna rail disaster occurred on 26 November 1998 near Khanna on the Khanna-Ludhiana section of India's Northern Railway in Punjab, at 03:15 when the Calcutta-bound Jammu Tawi-Sealdah Express collided with six derailed coaches of the Amritsar-bound "Frontier Mail" which were lying in its path. At least 212 were killed; in total the trains were estimated to be carrying 2,500 passengers. The initial derailment was caused by a broken rail.

Sources
151 killed in Punjab rail tragedy

See also
List of train accidents by death toll
List of Indian rail accidents

References

Derailments in India
Railway accidents in 1998
Ludhiana district
1990s in Punjab, India
Railway accidents and incidents in Punjab, India
Rail transport in Punjab, India
1998 in India
November 1998 events in Asia